Mananjary is a district of Vatovavy in Madagascar. Its capital is the city of Mananjary.

Communes
The district is further divided into 25 communes:

 Ambalahosy Nord
 Ambodinonoka
 Ambohimiarina II
 Ambohinihaonana
 Andonabe
 Andranambolava
 Anosimparihy
 Antsenavolo
 Irondro
 Kianjavato
 Mahaela
 Mahatsara Iefaka
 Mahatsara Sud
 Mahavoky Nord
 Manakana Nord
 Mananjary
 Marofototra
 Marokarima
 Marosangy
 Morafeno
 Namorona
 Sandrohy
 Tsaravary
 Tsiatosika
 Vatohandrina
 Vohilava

References 

Districts of Vatovavy